Patania punctimarginalis is a species of moth of the family Crambidae. It was described by George Hampson in 1896. It is found in Asia, including India, Indonesia, Japan and Taiwan.

References

Moths described in 1896
Spilomelinae
Moths of Japan